Sir William Wingfield (c. 1326 – 1398), of Cotton and Dennington, Suffolk, was an English Member of Parliament.

He was a Member (MP) of the Parliament of England for Suffolk in 1376, 1378, 1381, May 1382, October 1382, February 1383, October 1383, 1386, January 1390 and November 1390.

References

1326 births
1398 deaths
14th-century English people
People from Suffolk
Members of the Parliament of England (pre-1707)